The Edwards-Fowler House in Rocky Top, Tennessee was built between 1835 and 1838 on land given to Nicely Ross Edwards and husband Edward C. Edwards by Nicely's father, James Ross. Ross gave the couple  and several slaves, who provided labor to build the house, which has been called The Hemlocks after the two massive hemlock trees that grow in front of the house. The Edwards family owned the house from 1838 until about 1900 when the Fowler family, originally from Knoxville, Tennessee, bought the house. The house has remained structurally unchanged for over 175 years, making the Edwards Fowler house the oldest and only Federal-style house in Anderson County, Tennessee.

The house was constructed of locally quarried limestone and bricks made on the site. Foundations of slave cabins exist behind the house. It was placed on the National Register of Historic Places on May 29, 1975.

References

Houses on the National Register of Historic Places in Tennessee
Federal architecture in Tennessee
Houses completed in 1837
National Register of Historic Places in Anderson County, Tennessee
Slave cabins and quarters in the United States
1837 establishments in Tennessee